En el último piso is a 1942 Argentine film directed by Catrano Catrani.

Cast
Zully Moreno
Juan Carlos Thorry
Miguel Gómez Bao
José Blanco
Hector Chevalier	... 	El Tata
Max Citelli
Dario Cossier
Adrián Cuneo
César Fiaschi
Fernando Lamas
Rosa Martín
Salvador Sinaí

External links
 

1942 films
1940s Spanish-language films
Argentine black-and-white films
Films directed by Catrano Catrani
Argentine comedy-drama films
1942 comedy-drama films
1940s Argentine films